Shrewton United Football Club is a football club based in Shrewton, near Amesbury, in Wiltshire, England.

History
The club was formed in 1946. They entered the Wiltshire Football League and won Division Three in 1977–78, 1978–79 and 1980–81. After finishing runners-up in Division One in 1990–91 and 1992–93, the club won the league in 1996–97. The division was renamed the Premier Division in 1998, and in the following seasons they finished runners-up twice. They won the Wiltshire Football League Premier Division in 2001–02 and 2002–03. After the second title, they were accepted into the Western League Division One but returned to the Wiltshire League at the end of the 2012-13 season.

Ground
Shrewton United play their home games at the Recreation Ground, Mill Lane, Shrewton, SP3 4JY.

Honours
Wiltshire Football League Premier Division (formerly Division One)
Champions 1996–97, 2001–02, 2002–03
Runners-up 1990–91, 1992–93, 1998–99, 2000–01
Wiltshire Football League Division Three
Champions 1977–78, 1978–79, 1980–81

Records
FA Cup
Extra Preliminary Round 2011–12
FA Vase
First Round 2006–07, 2011–12

Former players
One of Shrewton's most famous former players, still active in the game, is Cheltenham Town's professional phase coach Alex Penny, who played over 200 games for the club between 1990–93 and 1997–99.

References

Football clubs in Wiltshire
Association football clubs established in 1946
1946 establishments in England
Football clubs in England
Wiltshire Football League
Western Football League